Eighth-seeds Kevin Curren and Steve Denton won the title and shared $10,600 after beating Wojciech Fibak and Ivan Lendl in the final.

Seeds
A champion seed is indicated in bold text while text in italics indicates the round in which that seed was eliminated.

Draw

Finals

Top half

Bottom half

References

External links

U.S. Clay Court Championships
1980 U.S. Clay Court Championships